Tiruchi Siva is a member of the Parliament of India representing Tamil Nadu in the Rajya Sabha, the upper house of parliament. He is from the Dravida Munnetra Kazhagam party, and was elected in 1996, 2002, 2007, 2014 and 2020. He is a speaker and a writer.

Career
As a student, he was imprisoned for one year under the Maintenance of Internal Security Act (MISA) during the Emergency of 1976. In 1978 he was an organizer for the DMK District Student’s Wing. Between 1982 and 1992 he served as the Deputy Secretary of the DMK Youth Wing and later serving as the Secretary of the same between 1992 and 2007. He was the Propaganda Secretary of the DMK.

Has written articles in the Party’s official organ Murasoli and other magazines.

In Parliament

Historic Private Member Bill to Protect Rights of Transgenders
On 24 April 2015, Mr. Siva created history when he introduced a private member's bill, the Rights of Transgender Persons Bill, 2014, and after much discussion the Bill was put on a voice vote and was unanimously passed by the Rajya Sabha. This was the first Private member's bill to be passed by any house in 36 years and by the Upper House in 45 Years.  The Bill was passed with the intent to help transgender people get benefits akin to those in scheduled castes and tribes, and in taking steps to see that they are not denied enrollment in schools or denied jobs in government as well as working to ensure they are protected from sexual harassment.

Fourth Term in Parliament - 2014-2020
On Women's Day 8 March 2018, Mr.Siva asked the Government to exempt sanitary napkins from GST net.

Raising a Special Mention in Rajya Sabha on NEET Exams, he raised the concern that the two bills passed unanimously by the Tamil Nadu Legislative Assembly which was sent for Presidential Assent was still pending with the Ministry of Home and Health which is a bad situation for the Federal Set Up of the Country.

Participating in the Debate on Passage of Citizenship Amendment Bill in Rajya Sabha on 11 Dec 2019, he strongly opposed the bill, raising several questions including why Minorities from Sri Lanka were excluded and why the Bill targets only Muslims which has created a sense of apprehension amongst the Muslims in India.

   
On 10 December 2019, He was awarded the Best Parliamentarian of the Year (Rajya Sabha) at the Lokmat Parliamentary Awards - 2019.Vice President M Venkaiah Naidu presented the award for his exemplary contribution to Rajya Sabha.

Fifth Term in Parliament
On 2 March 2020, he was re-nominated to Rajya Sabha by the DMK President M K Stalin. On 18 March 2020, Mr.Siva became the first DMK MP to serve a fourth term in Rajya Sabha.

During this time, he was interviewed by Mohammed Al Sheikh Bin Suleihad, a relatively unknown political journalist from Afghanistan working for Talk Tamil News. He discussed important issues related to controversial topics. Later Talk Tamil and Suleihad published an article faming him and noted:

"he is the only one in India who's worthy of PM..."

Other Prominent Posts
He has also served as a member of the Court of the Jawaharlal Nehru University from September 2009 to May 2012 and was the Vice-President of the Parliamentary Forum on Artisans and Craftspeople from April 2013 to July 2013.

Membership in Various Committees in his Five Terms

First Term (Lok Sabha) - 1996 - 1997 	 	 	 	 	
Member, Committee on External Affairs.
Member, Consultative Committee for the Ministry of Petroleum and Natural Gas 
Member, Select Committee on Womens Reservation Bill
Member, Committee on Public Undertakings

Second Term (Rajya Sabha) - 2000 - 2002 
Member, Committee on Communications  
Member, Consultative Committee for the Ministry of Information Technology 
Member, Select Committee on Broadcasting Bill

Third Term (Rajya Sabha) - 2007 - 2013  
Aug 2007-May 2008 Member, Committee on Water Resources
Aug 2007-Aug 2010 Member, Spices Board 
Aug 2007-May 2009 Member, Consultative Committee for the Ministry of Shipping, Road Transport and Highways 
May 2008-May 2009 Member, Committee on the Welfare of Scheduled Castes and Scheduled Tribes 
May 2008-Sep 2009 Member, Committee on Subordinate Legislation 
May 2008-May 2009 and Aug 2010-Aug 2011 Member, Committee on Home Affairs
May 2008-Sep 2010 Member, Committee of Privileges
Jun 2008 Jul 2013, General Purposes Committee
Aug 2009-Aug 2010 Member, Committee on Personnel, Public Grievances, Law and Justice 
Sep 2009 onwards Member, Court of the Jawaharlal Nehru University 
Dec 2009-Jul 2010 Member, Select Committee to examine the Commercial Division of High Courts Bill, 
May 2010-May 2011 Member, Committee on Public Accounts 
Jul 2010-Jul 2013 Member, Consultative Committee for the Ministry of Civil Aviation 
Aug 2010-Jul 2013 Chairman, Committee on Industry 
Sep 2010 Jul 2013 Member, Committee on Ethics 
Mar 2011-Jul 2013 Member, JPC to examine matters relating to allocation and pricing of telecom licences and spectrum 
Jun 2012-Nov 2012 Member, Select Committee of Rajya Sabha on the Lokpal and Lokayuktas Bill, 2011
Aug 2012 onwards Chairman, Committee on Personnel, Public Grievances, Law and Justice

Fourth Term (Rajya Sabha) - 2014 - 2020
Aug 2014 Onwards Member, General Purposes Committee
May 2016 Onwards Member, Committee on the Welfare of Scheduled Cast and Scheduled Tribes 
Sep 2014 Onwards Member, Committee on Human Resource Development 
Dec 2014 Onwards Member, Select Committee of Rajya Sabha to the Payment and Settlement Systems (Amendment) Bill, 2014
Mar 2015 Onwards Member, Select Committee of Rajya Sabha on the Coal Mines (Special Provisions) Bill, 2015 
Dec 2015 Onwards Member, Select Committee of Rajya Sabha on the Prevention of Corruption (Amendment) Bill

Works published
(in Tamil)
 Kutravaali Koondil Socrates
 Thalainagiril Tamilan Kural

References

External links
  Profile on Lok Sabha website
 FaceBook Page

Rajya Sabha members from Tamil Nadu
1954 births
Living people
Politicians from Tiruchirappalli
India MPs 1996–1997
Lok Sabha members from Tamil Nadu
People from Pudukkottai district
Dravida Munnetra Kazhagam politicians